Standing NATO Maritime Group One (SNMG1) is one of NATO's standing naval maritime immediate reaction forces. SNMG1 consists of four to six destroyers and frigates. Its role is to provide NATO with an immediate operational response capability.

History
In late November 1966, U.S. Rear Admiral Richard G. Colbert prepared a concept paper proposing a permanent Allied Command Atlantic naval contingency force based on Operation Matchmaker, an annual six-month exercise involving ships from NATO navies. The proposed contingency force was approved by NATO in December 1967 and activated in January 1968 as Standing Naval Force Atlantic (STANAVFORLANT).

During the 1990s, STANAVFORLANT was heavily involved in Operation Maritime Monitor (July 1992 to November 1992), Operation Maritime Guard (November 1992 to June 1993) and Operation Sharp Guard (June 1993 to October 1996), the maritime embargo operations in the Adriatic Sea established to ensure compliance by Serbia and Montenegro with United Nations (UN) resolutions 713, 715, 787, 820 and 943. Between November 1992 and June 1996 some 74,000 ships were challenged, almost 6,000 were inspected at sea and more than 1,400 were diverted and inspected in port.

The force was under the operational control of SACLANT until SACLANT was decommissioned in 2003 and it was folded into NATO's Allied Command Operations (ACO) at that time.

The force was re-designated Standing NATO Maritime Group 1 in January 2005.

In September 2007, SNMG1 was in the Red Sea bound for Suez to complete a circumnavigation of Africa when the Jabal al-Tair volcano erupted. SNMG1 ships assisted the Yemeni coast guard in the recovery of their military personnel stationed on the island.

From March 2009 to June 2009 SNMG1 was deployed by NATO off the Somali coast to conduct Operation Allied Protector, to deter, defend and protect World Food Programme (WFP) vessels against the threat of piracy and armed robbery, thereby allowing WFP to fulfill its mission of providing humanitarian aid.

Since August 2009, SNMG1 has been providing ships for NATO's Operation Ocean Shield anti-piracy mission in the Gulf of Aden.

The group's commander, Commodore Ben Bekkering, Royal Netherlands Navy visited Enterprise. At the time the group consisted of the Royal Netherlands Navy frigate , the Spanish Navy frigate , the German Navy frigate , and the Royal Canadian Navy frigate .

In November 2018, HNoMS Helge Ingstad was operating with SNMG1 when she was involved in a collision with a Maltese flagged tanker and had to be deliberately run aground to prevent her sinking. The remainder of SNMG1 stood by to provide assistance.

During 2021, SNMG1 was active in the region of the Baltic Sea for 12 days.

Current ships
As of 8 January 2023, SNMG1 consists of:

Ships in bold are currently part of the naval force

Previous task groups
In 2022, SNMG1 consisted of:

Ships in bold are currently part of the naval force

In 2021, SNMG1 consisted of:

During this deployment, SNMG1 took part in numerous exercises including:
 TG 21-1 from February 8 to February 19 in Norway
 Dynamic Guard 21 from February 24 to February 26 in Norway
 Joint Warrior 21-1 from May 7 to May 14 in the United Kingdom
 Steadfast Defender 21 from May 21 to June 2 in Portugal
 BALTOPS50 from June 6 to June 18 in the Baltic Sea
 Dynamic Mongoose 21 from July 1 to July 9 in Norway
 Joint Warrior 21-2 from 18 September to 30 September 2021 in the United Kingdom
 FLOTEX 21 from November 22 to December 3 in Norway
 Exercise REP(MUS) from 12 September to 22 September in Portugal

Organization
SNMG1 is a component of the NATO Response Force (NRF).

See also
Standing NATO Maritime Group 2
Standing NATO Mine Countermeasures Group 1
Standing NATO Mine Countermeasures Group 2

References

External links

 Official SNMG1 Homepage
 Allied Maritime Command Headquarters Homepage
 Africa Deployment Brochure 
 Photos from SNMG1 2009

Military units and formations of NATO
Military units and formations established in 1968